The Hanan Shield is one of the most prestigious trophies in New Zealand's domestic rugby union competition. First played for in 1946 after being presented by the Mayor of Timaru, A.E.S. Hanan. The Hanan Shield is based on a challenge system played between North Otago, South Canterbury and Mid Canterbury. The holding union must defend the shield in challenge matches, and if a challenger defeats them, they become the new holder of the shield. A rules change at the end of the 2011 season meant that the shield is up for challenge in any meeting between the holders and one of the other two teams.

The Hanan Shield is held by Mid Canterbury, who beat South Canterbury 34–27 on 21 September 2013. One month later Mid Canterbury defended the shield on 26 October by defeating North Otago 26–20 in the 2013 Meads Cup final. Nearly one year later, Mid Canterbury were able to defend it for a second time in a row after defeating North Otago 28–7. Mid Canterbury has held it ever since.

Overall record (1946–2006)

 A draw is recorded as a win for the holders

2007
On 6 October 2007, Mid Canterbury won the Shield from North Otago with a 25–22 victory. In a fiercely contested clash in front of a record crowd at Oamaru's Centennial Park, Mid Canterbury played themselves into a Shield winning position. Mid Canterbury made the decisive break thanks to two stunning solo tries to young winger Brenton Connell, then hung on in the final 20 minutes despite losing star midfielder Jack Umaga to a broken jaw. This ended North Otago's Hanan Shield reign of 14 defences over seven years.

2008
On 9 August Mid Canterbury made their first Hanan Shield defence of 2008 when they ran onto the Ashburton Showgrounds to play South Canterbury. It was the first Hanan Shield match contested under the new experimental law variations (ELVs), and it was South Canterbury who put on the early pressure with prop Timaru Tafa crossing in the 6th minute. Mid Canterbury's 19-year-old wing Brenton Connell sliced through a midfield gap on his own 10-metre line, broke a tackle and sprinted away down the left-hand flank to score in the corner. In the 29th minute, loose forward Jon Dampney showed his strength in shrugging off a tackler to score in the corner. Connell made it two for the afternoon when Dampney took a quick throw, which saw the ball spread to the opposite sideline into the hands of Connell who crossed the line and scored. South Canterbury started the second half strong, and scored two tries in the first 10 minutes, to loose forward Eric Smith and Tafa got his second. Mid Canterbury were trailing 19–18 but were not about to give up. A try to second five-eighth Richard Fridd pulled them back into the game, while two more tries were scored by first five-eighth Dan Maw and Dampney who scored his second. Mid Canterbury 37 (Brenton Connell 2, Jon Dampney 2, Richard Fridd, Dan Maw tries; Dan Maw pen, two con) South Canterbury 19 (Timaru Tafa 2, Eric Smith tries; Luke Reihana two con), HT: 18–5.

2011 to 2015 seasons

North Otago defeated Mid Canterbury 24–18 on 24 September 2011. 

Mid Canterbury claimed the Hanan Shield from North Otago with a 7–3 win on 8 September 2012.

On 13 October 2012 South Canterbury claimed the shield by defeating Mid Canterbury 17–15 at Fraser Park in Timaru. South Canterbury outscored their opponents by three tries to two.

South Canterbury retained the shield by defeating Mid Canterbury 48–20 in the 2012 Lochore Cup semi-final on 21 October.

Mid Canterbury won the Shield with a win 34-27 against South Canterbury on 21 September 2013.

Mid Canterbury defended the shield by defeating North Otago 26–20 in the 2013 Meads Cup final on 26 October. Also, this was Mid Canterbury's first time winning the Meads Cup.

Mid Canterbury was to next defend the shield against North Otago on 4 October 2014 in Ashburton. They won the match 28–7.

Mid Canterbury next defended the shield against South Canterbury in Timaru on 11 October 2014, only one week after their match against North Otago. They won 24–7.

Mid Canterbury next defended the Hanan Shield in the 2015 Heartland Championship on 22 August 2015.

In the last match of the regular season, Mid Canterbury successfully defended the Shield against North Otago in Oamaru.

2016 to 2019 seasons 
In the first match of the 2016 Heartland Championship season, Mid Canterbury attempted to defend the Shield for a sixth consecutive time. Mid Canterbury successfully defended the shield in a high-scoring affair.

On 15 October 2016 South Canterbury, on their home ground, won the Shield from Mid Canterbury.

South Canterbury defended the Shield on four occasions throughout 2017 and 2018.

On 24 August 2019, in an away fixture, North Otago ended the Shield reign of South Canterbury. North Otago defended it against Mid Canterbury.

2020 season onwards

On 12 September 2020, South Canterbury won the Shield back from North Otago. South Canterbury retained the Shield through to the end of the 2021 season.

See also

Ranfurly Shield
Heartland Championship

References

New Zealand rugby union competitions
Rugby union trophies and awards
New Zealand sports trophies and awards
1946 establishments in New Zealand